A cryophorus is a glass container containing liquid water and water vapor. It is used in physics courses to demonstrate rapid freezing by evaporation. A typical cryophorus has a bulb at one end connected to a tube of the same material. When the liquid water is manipulated into the bulbed end and the other end is submerged into a freezing mixture (such as liquid nitrogen),  the gas pressure drops as it is cooled.  The liquid water begins to evaporate, producing more water vapor. Evaporation causes the water to cool rapidly to its freezing point and it solidifies suddenly.

Wollaston's cryophorus was a precursor to the modern heat pipe.

History 
The cryophorus was first described by William Hyde Wollaston in an 1813 paper titled, "On a method of freezing at a distance."

References

Notes 

Laboratory glassware
Phase transitions
Physics education
Thermodynamics